Kaluđerica is a village in the municipality of Radoviš, North Macedonia.

Demographics
According to the 2002 census, the village had a total of 838 inhabitants. Ethnic groups in the village include:

Macedonians 722
Turks 26
Serbs 1
Romani 88
Others 1

References

Villages in Radoviš Municipality